Adon Smith House is a historic home located at Hamilton in Madison County, New York. It was built about 1850 and is a -story brick dwelling with Italianate elements.  It features a "U"-shaped porch with elaborate wrought iron columns and railings and has a glazed belvedere.  It is now used as the village office building.

It was added to the National Register of Historic Places in 1974.

References

Houses on the National Register of Historic Places in New York (state)
Italianate architecture in New York (state)
Houses completed in 1850
Houses in Madison County, New York
National Register of Historic Places in Madison County, New York